is located in the Hidaka Mountains, Hokkaidō, Japan.

References

 Geographical Survey Institute
 Hokkaipedia

Toyoni (Erimo)